The name Pepeng or (initially) Pabling has been used for three tropical cyclones in the Philippines by PAGASA in the Western Pacific Ocean.

 Tropical Depression 29W (2001) (29W, Pabling) – passed over the southwest Philippines.
 Tropical Storm Bolaven (2005) (T0523, 24W, Pepeng) – struck the northern Philippines.
 Typhoon Parma (2009) - (T0917, 19W, Pepeng) – a damaging Category 4 super typhoon that traversed the Northern Philippines, made landfall on the island of Hainan, China, and then in Vietnam.

The name Pepeng was retired after the 2009 typhoon season, and replaced by Paolo for 2013 season.

Pacific typhoon set index articles